Ross Haywood (born 18 February 1947) is an Australian long-distance runner. He competed in the marathon at the 1976 Summer Olympics.

References

External links
 

1947 births
Living people
Athletes (track and field) at the 1974 British Commonwealth Games
Athletes (track and field) at the 1976 Summer Olympics
Australian male long-distance runners
Australian male marathon runners
Australian male racewalkers
Olympic athletes of Australia
Place of birth missing (living people)
Commonwealth Games competitors for Australia
20th-century Australian people
21st-century Australian people